Clough is an extinct town in Meade County, in the U.S. state of South Dakota. The GNIS classifies it as a populated place.

History
Clough was laid out in 1910, and named after the father of a first settler. A post office called Clough was established in 1909, and remained in operation until 1943.

References

Ghost towns in South Dakota
Geography of Meade County, South Dakota